Grevillea stenobotrya is a shrub or small tree in the family Proteaceae that is endemic to arid regions of Australia. Common names include  rattle-pod grevillea, sandhill grevillea, sandhill oak and sandhill spider flower.

Description
The evergreen leaves are green on top and silver underneath with a linear shape. Flowers are cream, pale yellow or pale pink. These appear in clustered spikes at the end of branches between May and December in the species' native range.
The fruits which follow are hard, flattened and rounded and have a short beak.

Taxonomy
The species was formally described in 1875 by Victorian Government Botanist Ferdinand von Mueller in the ninth volume of his Fragmenta Phytographiae Australiae. Mueller's description was based on plant material collected in the MacDonnell Ranges in central Australia during an expedition by Ernest Giles. The specific epithet is derived from the Greek words  stenos (narrow)  and botrys (bunch of grapes). It occurs in red sandhill country in association with other shrub and Triodia species. The Australian Plant Census lists two synonyms; Grevillea simulans Morrison (1912) and Grevillea livea Ewart & M.E.L.Archer (1917).

Distribution
In Western Australia the plant is found in the Gascoyne, Pilbara, north-eastern Mid West, south Kimberley and north-eastern Goldfields regions. It is found as far west as Denham to between Port Hedland and Broome in the north and down to around the Great Victoria Desert in the south. The range extends as far east as the border with the Northern Territory and South Australia. It is commonly found situated on sand dunes growing in red sandy soils. It is also found in central and southern parts of the Northern Territory and northern parts of South Australia on sand flats, sand dunes and swales where it is can be a dominant or co-dominant plant in sclerophyllous woodland or shrubland communities. The range extends into south western parts of Queensland and north western parts of New South Wales in the east. In New South Wales it is confined to a small area around Tibooburra where it is situated in sandhill country usually on or near the crests of active or stable dunes as a part of shrubland and Triodia communities.

Cultivation
The plant is available commercially is seed form and is suitable for arid areas and can be used as a screen or hedge which will flower in winter and spring. It prefers an open sunny position in a well drained soil and is frost and drought tolerant. It is unsuitable for wet or humid areas.

Other uses
Indigenous Australians used the leaves for medicinal purposes and the seeds as a food source. The dried seed pods were also used for rattles as part of ceremonial processes.

See also
List of Grevillea species

References

External links
Herbarium specimen at Kew Botanic Gardens

stenobotrya
Flora of New South Wales
Flora of the Northern Territory
Flora of Queensland
Flora of South Australia
Eudicots of Western Australia
Proteales of Australia
Taxa named by Ferdinand von Mueller
Plants described in 1875